The San Diego State Aztecs men's golf team represents San Diego State University in the sport of golf. The Aztecs compete in the Mountain West Conference (MW) in Division I of the National Collegiate Athletic Association (NCAA). Having reached the NCAA Division I Men's Golf Championship 28 times, men's golf has reached more NCAA championships than any other San Diego State athletic team.

Postseason

See also
 Aztec Hall of Fame

References

External links